Michael 'Mike' Archer Winch (born 20 July 1948) is a male retired British shot putter.

Athletics career
Winch represented England and won a silver medal in the shot put event, at the 1974 British Commonwealth Games in Christchurch, New Zealand. Four years later he represented England in the discus and shot put events, at the 1978 Commonwealth Games in Edmonton, Alberta, Canada and in 1982 he represented England for the third time at the Commonwealth Games and won another silver medal in the shot put event, at the 1982 Commonwealth Games in Brisbane, Queensland, Australia.

Coaching
Subsequent to his athletics career he has coached international athletes (mainly throwers) including multiple gold medallist Judy Oakes OBE, and Olympic athletes Philippa Roles and Emeka Udechuku.  He was chief British throws coach at the World Championships in Gothenburg 1991, chief throws coach to the England team in Kuala Lumpur 1998 and overall chief coach of England's athletics team at the 2002 Manchester Commonwealth Games

Personal life
He was UK Athletics Vice President for four years, stepping down in February 2008 over the governing body’s handling of the Dwain Chambers controversy. He has written several sporting technical books (strength and conditioning training) and three novels: Running From Gold, Run to Death, and The Convocation of Colours).

References

External links
 The Association of British Hammer throwers
 Mike Winch's website

1948 births
Living people
English male shot putters
British male shot putters
Commonwealth Games medallists in athletics
Commonwealth Games silver medallists for England
Athletes (track and field) at the 1974 British Commonwealth Games
Athletes (track and field) at the 1978 Commonwealth Games
Athletes (track and field) at the 1982 Commonwealth Games
Medallists at the 1974 British Commonwealth Games
Medallists at the 1982 Commonwealth Games